Chuansha is a station on Line 2 of the Shanghai Metro, located in the town of Chuanxinsha, Pudong.

References

Line 2, Shanghai Metro
Railway stations in China opened in 2010
Shanghai Metro stations in Pudong
Railway stations in Shanghai